Clienteling is a technique used by retail sales associates to establish long-term relationships with key customers based on data about their preferences, behaviors and purchases. Clienteling is intended to guide associates to provide more personal and informed customer service  that may influence customer behavior related to shopping frequency, lift in average transaction value, and other retail key performance indicators. From the customer's perspective, clienteling "could add a layer of personal touch" to the shopping experience.

Clienteling software 
While at its core, clienteling is a sales technique, the term is commonly used today to describe the related assisted selling software tools used to support relationship-building activities between store associates and their customers. Software-based clienteling has been said to have the advantage of collecting data about clients across different interaction channels in a searchable and retrievable database for later use. Clienteling software may also provide digital tools on mobile devices or fixed workstations aimed at enabling retailers to establish long-lasting learning relationships with their customers. While sales history collected in customer relationship management (CRM) platforms can provide some insight into a customer’s tendencies, this insight can be augmented by data collected by an associate working directly with a customer, who can improve the customer profile through each face-to-face interaction. This information can then be used to further personalize future interactions. Capabilities such as notes, wish lists, preferences, alerts, and purchase history are sometimes used to enable associates to enhance client profiles in ways that purchase history and e-commerce activity alone could not. Clienteling can also be an effective means of selling excess inventory without resorting to discounting by pairing products with the right consumers, using their past purchases to predict what they are likely want to buy.

Use in retail stores 
In 2014, a software-based clienteling solution was deployed on iPad to over 3,500 associates at Saks Fifth Avenue. Ralph Lauren has also used clienteling to invite select shoppers to special shopping events.

See also 
 Consumer relationship system
 Customer experience

References 

Customer relationship management
Online advertising methods
Retail processes and techniques